The Valea Boului (also known as Bătrâna) is a left tributary of the river Buzău in Romania. It discharges into the Buzău in Vișani. It flows through Lake Jirlău.

References

Rivers of Romania
Rivers of Brăila County
Rivers of Buzău County